The UK Screen Alliance (formerly UK Screen Association) is a trade body that represents British companies working in the film, TV and commercials industries. The association promotes the business interests of companies involved in audio and video post-production, visual effects (VFX), special effects, animation, camera and equipment hire and production studios.

The current CEO, appointed in 2016 is Neil Hatton.

Leading member companies include Framestore, Double Negative, Industrial Light and Magic UK, MPC, The Mill, Aardman Animations,  Technicolor and Molinare.

History 

In 2004 the Department of Trade and Industry and the UK Film Council provided seed funding to assist in the establishment of a new trade body to represent the UK's post production and visual effects sector. This led to the foundation of UK Post (later to be renamed UK Screen Association). UK Post made a contribution to the film tax consultation conducted by HM Treasury and Department for Digital, Culture, Media and Sport. It also engaged with the BBC to access information to enable its member companies to make decisions about the future direction of their businesses.

UK Post's remit expanded in 2006 to provide representation for all companies providing services to the film and broadcast industry in 2006. On 5 September 2006, the association's name was changed to UK Post & Services. In 2007 the association's board decided that a more radical change of name was necessary to reflect the trade body's broadened remit, its expanded membership and the industry's move towards multi-platform content creation and delivery. The board announced the name had been changed to UK Screen Association on 30 May 2007.

UK Screen played a significant part in driving the changes to the UK's Film and High-End TV tax relief announced in the  2013 Autumn Statement which created an increase in inward investment work. Further lobbying during 2014 resulted in the lowering of the qualification threshold for tax relief from 25% to 10% in the Chancellor's Budget of 2015 and reform of the cultural test.  This allowed many productions to qualify for tax relief on the basis of VFX or post production work alone.

In November 2016, UK Screen Association announced that it was joining forces with Animation UK to form the UK Screen Alliance, citing increasingly converging policy interests and a desire for a louder voice to government.

During the COVID-19 pandemic, the UK Screen Alliance published Guidance for Safe Working in Post Production and VFX which was produced in consultation with British Film Commission, BFI, BECTU, Producers Alliance for Cinema and Television and the Department for Digital, Culture, Media and Sport.

Mission 

UK Screen Alliance acts as the strategic lobbying group interacting with government agencies, providing a support mechanism and a voice for its members, with particular focus on:

 Fiscal, legislative, and employment and standards 
 The promotion of the film, TV, animation and commercials sector to existing and potential clients in both the UK and abroad 
 Development of skills
 Ensure the best talents from the home and abroad are attracted to work within the UK's film, TV, animation and commercials industry

Projects 

 Access:VFX - UK Screen Alliance is a founder member of this VFX industry movement to encourage inclusion in the industry
 Conch awards - awards (2006-2012), recognising the achievements of individuals and companies working in audio post production.

References

External links
 UK Screen Alliance

Arts and media trade groups
Film organisations in the United Kingdom
Trade associations based in the United Kingdom
Organisations based in the City of Westminster
Organizations established in 2004
Television organisations in the United Kingdom
2004 establishments in the United Kingdom